The following highways are numbered 262:

Brazil
 BR-262

Canada
Manitoba Provincial Road 262
Prince Edward Island Route 262

Japan
 Japan National Route 262

United States
 Arkansas Highway 262
 California State Route 262
 Connecticut Route 262
 Georgia State Route 262
 Indiana State Road 262
Kentucky Route 262
 Maryland Route 262
 Minnesota State Highway 262
 Montana Secondary Highway 262
 New Mexico State Road 262
 New York State Route 262
 Pennsylvania Route 262
 South Carolina Highway 262
 South Dakota Highway 262
 Tennessee State Route 262
 Texas State Highway 262 (former)
 Texas State Highway Loop 262
 Farm to Market Road 262 (Texas)
 Utah State Route 262
 Virginia State Route 262
 Washington State Route 262